Northside Christian School is a private school located in Westerville, Ohio.

Northside Christian School offers grades K4 through 12. The school is a ministry of Calvary Bible Church and is a member of Association of Christian Schools International (ACSI) - Major accrediting body for Protestant schools in the U.S.

Northside Christian competes in the Ohio High School Athletic Association (OHSAA), in the Mid-Ohio Christian Athletic League (MOCAL).

Fine Arts
Art classes are available for K5 through 12th grades. Drama is presented on the secondary school level with occasional opportunities for elementary students.

Sports
Fall: soccer, volleyball, Cross Country
Winter: basketball, cheerleading
Spring: track

Notes and references

External links 
 Northside Christian School official website

High schools in Franklin County, Ohio
Westerville, Ohio
Educational institutions established in 1971
Private high schools in Ohio